Gibberula dulcis is a species of sea snail, a marine gastropod mollusk, in the family Cystiscidae.

References

dulcis
Gastropods described in 1904
Cystiscidae